See also List of Aragonese monarchs

This is a list of consorts of the monarchs of the Kingdom of Aragon. Blanche II of Navarre and Philip I of Castile died before their spouses inherited the crown.

Countesses

Queens

House of Aragon

House of Trastámara

Consorts of claimants against John II, 1462–1472
During the war against John II, there were three who claimed his throne, though this never included the Kingdom of Valencia. One of the three was Peter V of Aragon who remained a bachelor.  The others, Henry IV of Castile and René of Anjou, had wives during their "reigns" as pretenders.  The wife of Henry IV was Joan of Portugal, a Portuguese infanta daughter of King Edward of Portugal and his wife Eleanor of Aragon.  The first wife of Rene died prior to 1462; his second wife was Jeanne de Laval, a French noblewoman and daughter Guy XIV de Laval, Count of Laval and Isabella of Brittany.

House of Habsburg

In 1556, the union of the Spanish kingdoms is generally called Spain and Mary I of England (second wife of Philip II) is the first Queen of Spain. Philip II was son of Charles I and Isabella of Portugal.

See also
List of Hispanic consorts
List of Majorcan consorts
Countess of Barcelona
List of Castilian consorts
List of Asturian consorts
List of Castilian monarchs
List of Galician monarchs
List of Leonese consorts
List of Navarrese consorts
List of Spanish consorts
Princess of Girona

Notes

Sources

Aragonese queen consorts
Women of medieval Spain
Crown of Aragon
Aragonese
Aragon
Aragon